Alfredo García Green (born December 29, 1953) is a Mexican politician affiliated with the conservative National Action Party (PAN). He was the first municipal president (mayor) of Loreto, Baja California Sur, following the municipality's 1992 creation, and the state's party president. García Green is the son of Consuelo Green Garayzar and stepson of Francisco Larrinaga. He has worked with the environmental NGO "Grupo Ecologista Antares", which is involved in conservation efforts in the Loreto region.

Career
Owner of an auto parts store.
1993–1996. Municipal President of Loreto, BCS.
1999–2002. President of the Partido Acción Nacional State committee in Baja California Sur.
2002–2007. Chief in Baja California Sur of the Office of Housing Institute for the Workers (INFONAVIT).
2007. Chief of FONATUR – BMO, S.A. DE C.V. in Loreto, BCS.

Mayoralty
Alfredo García Green served as mayor of Loreto from 1993 through 1996. He was one of the few Mexican Municipal presidents to avoid a major financial upheaval during office without getting any public debt (the only one in the Baja California Sur state during that term) and left the office to his successor without any financial trouble. During his term, he applied innovation in public services in order to improve the city deficient services (waste collection, water supply, municipal taxes registration system, street cleaning, street pavement). He worked with the NGO "Grupo Ecologista Antares" in order to promote a national park in the Loreto area, which was finally created in July 1996 by presidential decree. He had problems with the public workers' union (which members worked for the then ruling Partido Revolucionario Institucional party) and with State Governor Guillermo Mercado Romero, who denied central government grants to the city of Loreto.

References

1953 births
Living people
20th-century Mexican politicians
Municipal presidents in Baja California Sur
National Action Party (Mexico) politicians
Politicians from Baja California Sur